The kediyu is a garment worn by men in the rural coastal parts of western Gujarat, including Junagadh district. The kediyu is a long sleeved upper garment, pleated at the chest, which reaches to the waist. The prints on the kediyu include bandhani designs which are local to Gujarat and Rajasthan. The kediyu is often worn with chorno, also called kafni, which refers to the pantaloons that are wide and tied loosely at the ankles, and is based on the styles worn in Iraq which were introduced to the coastal region during the 7th century by traders. The chorno/surwal can also be worn with a jama.

References

See also

 Central Asian clothing
 Chemise
 Chikankari
 Churidar
 Dhoti
 Dupatta
 Gagra choli
 Khet partug
 Kurta
 Perahan tunban
 Kashmiri phiran and poots
 Qamis
 Sari
 Sherwani
 Sirwal
 Turkish salvar

Indian clothing
Indian culture